The Battle of Lircay was the last battle of the Chilean Civil War of 1829–1830 and ended with the Pipiolos (Liberals) being decisively defeated. Pipiolo leader Ramon Freire was exiled to Peru and the Pipiolos defeated to end the war, beginning a 30-year dominance of the Government of Chile by the Conservatives.

References 

1830 in Chile
Lircay
Lircay
History of Maule Region